Events from the year 1791 in Scotland.

Incumbents

Law officers 
 Lord Advocate – Robert Dundas of Arniston
 Solicitor General for Scotland – Robert Blair

Judiciary 
 Lord President of the Court of Session – Lord Succoth
 Lord Justice General – The Viscount Stormont
 Lord Justice Clerk – Lord Braxfield

Events 
 22 August – Galloway Association of Glasgow founded as the Glasgow Galloway Brotherly Society.
 Agriculturalist Sir John Sinclair imports ewes of Cheviot sheep from the Northumberland/Scottish Borders to Caithness and Sutherland where they will form the basis of the North Country Cheviot breed.

Publications 
 Francis Grose – The Antiquities of Scotland, volume 2
 Sir John Sinclair – Statistical Account of Scotland, begins publication, introducing the term Statistics into English

Births 
 April  – William Mackenzie, ophthalmologist (died 1868)
 21 June – Robert Napier, engineer, "Father of Clyde Shipbuilding" (died 1876)
 4 September – Robert Knox, surgeon, anatomist and zoologist (died 1862 in England)
 7 November – Robert Nasmyth, dental surgeon (died 1870)

Deaths 
 29 March – Elspeth Buchan, millenarian prophet, founder of the Buchanites (born c. 1738)
 7 July – Thomas Blacklock, poet (born 1721)
 Approximate date – Alan Breck Stewart, Jacobite (born c. 1711; died in exile)

The arts
 Poet Robert Burns gives up farming for a full-time post as an exciseman in Dumfries, writes "Ae Fond Kiss", "The Banks O' Doon" and "Sweet Afton", and publishes his last major poem, the narrative "Tam o' Shanter" (written 1790 and first published on 18 March 1791 in the Edinburgh Herald).

Sport 
 Burntisland Golf Club founded.

References 

 
Scotland
1790s in Scotland